Oswestry may refer to:
Oswestry
Borough of Oswestry
Oswestry railway station
Oswestry Cricket Club
Oswestry Rural
Oswestry School
Oswestry Town F.C.
Oswestry (UK Parliament constituency)
Oswestry Uplands
Old Oswestry